Megathyrsus is a genus of plants in the family Poaceae.

References

Panicoideae
Poaceae genera